This is a list of football games played by the South Korea national football team between 2000 and 2009.

Results by year

List of matches

2000

Source:

2001

Source:

2002

Source:

2003

Source:

2004

Source:

2005

Source:

2006

Source:

2007

Source:

2008

Source:

2009

Source:

See also
 South Korea national football team results
 South Korea national football team

References

External links

2000s in South Korean sport
2000